Shigeo Koshi is a Japanese animator, and film director. He is known for directing Doraemon: The New Record of Nobita's Spaceblazer.

Filmography

As director 
 1976: The Adventures of Pinocchio
 1977: Rascal the Raccoon
 1978: The Story of Perrine
 1979: Anne of Green Gables
 1981: Dogtanian and the Three Muskehounds
 1983: Alice in Wonderland
 1983: Rock 'n Roll Kids
 1988: Toppo Jijo
 1993: The Bots Master
 1997: Revolutionary Girl Utena
 1998: Grander Musashi RV
 2009: Doraemon the Movie: The New Records of Nobita's Spaceblazer

As animator 
 1986: Silverhawks
 1987: Thundercats
 1993: The Bots Master
 2001: Santa, Baby!
 2003: Globi and the Stolen Shadows

References 

Japanese animators
Japanese directors
Living people
Year of birth missing (living people)